Hare Sürel (born 5 March 1983) is a Turkish actress.

She was born in 1983 in Istanbul. Her family is originally from Samsun. She became interested in acting while in secondary school. Sürel graduated from Istanbul University State Conservatory with a degree in theatre studies. She received her master's from Marmara University.

She started her career in 2000. Between 2013–2014, she was cast in the teen drama series Medcezir as Leyla. In 2015, she appeared in the movie Bir Varmış Bir Yokmuş alongside Mert Fırat and Melisa Sözen. In the same year, she joined the cast of Kanal D TV series Poyraz Karayel, portraying the character of Meltem Karayel. In 2019, she was cast in the Show TV series Çukur.

Filmography

Film 
Kabadayı (Barmaid) 2007
Pek Yakında (Tuna Kaplan) (2014)
Fakat Müzeyyen Bu Derin Bir Tutku (Pınar) (2014)
Bir Varmış Bir Yokmuş (2015)
Aşkın Gören Gözlere İhtiyacı Yok (2017)

Television 
Ayrılsak da Beraberiz (1999–2001)
Ödünç Hayat (Maria) (2005)
Kız Babası (Ayşe Maria) (2006)
Senden Başka (Oya) (2007)
Elveda Rumeli (Emine) (2009)
Canımın İçi (Deniz) (2012)
Medcezir (Leyla) (2013–2015)
Poyraz Karayel (Meltem Karayel) (2015–2017)
Beş Kardeş (Yeşim Yahşi) (2015)
Vatanım Sensin (Latife Hanım) (2018)
Çukur (Damla) (2019–2021)

References

External links 
 

1983 births
Actresses from Istanbul
Turkish television actresses
Turkish film actresses
Living people